Franziskus von Sales Bauer (26 January 1841 – 25 November 1915) was an Austro-Hungarian Cardinal of the Roman Catholic Church. He served as Bishop of Brno (1882–1904) and later Archbishop of Olomouc from 1904 until his death, and was elevated to the cardinalate in 1911. He was also deputy of Moravian Diet.

Biography
Born in Hrachovec (now part of Valašské Meziříčí) in Moravia, Franziskus Bauer received the Sacrament of Confirmation in 1852, and studied at the seminary at the Faculty of Theology in Olomouc. He received the first tonsure and minor orders on 14 December 1859. Following his elevation to the subdiaconate (20 December 1862) and the diaconate (28 February 1863), Bauer was ordained to the priesthood on 19 July 1863, for the Archdiocese of Olomouc.

He then served as a cooperator, and later second chaplain in the parish of Vyškov, for the archdiocese until February 1865, whence he began teaching at the Theological Faculty of Olomouc. Bauer finished his studies in 1869, obtaining his doctorate in theology on June 30 of that year. He became Dean of the Theological Faculty in 1869 as well. He became a professor at the University of Prague on 19 September 1873, and later the Rector of the Archiepiscopal Seminary of Prague in 1879.

On 3 July 1883, Bauer was appointed Bishop of Brno by Pope Leo XIII. He received his episcopal consecration on the following August 15 from Cardinal Archbishop Friedrich Egon von Fürstenberg of Olomouc, with Bishops Gustav von Belript-Tissac and Karol Prucha serving as co-consecrators. Bauer was later named Archbishop of Olomouc on 10 May 1904. In virtue of this position, he was also prince, duke of Hotzenplotz, counselor to the emperor, and senator.

Pope Pius X created him Cardinal Priest of S. Girolamo degli Schiavoni in the consistory of 27 November 1911. Although eligible, Bauer did not participate in the 1914 papal conclave due to ill health.

Franziskus von Sales Bauer died in Olomouc at age 74. He is buried in the metropolitan cathedral of Olomouc.

References

External links

Cardinals of the Holy Roman Church
Catholic-Hierarchy 

1841 births
1915 deaths
People from Valašské Meziříčí
People from the Margraviate of Moravia
Moravian-German people
Czech cardinals
Members of the Moravian Diet
Burials at Saint Wenceslas Cathedral
Cardinals created by Pope Pius X
Clergy from Brno
Czech archbishops